Anthony Danel Henry (born November 3, 1976) is a former American football cornerback who played in the National Football League (NFL). He was drafted by the Cleveland Browns in the fourth round of the 2001 NFL Draft and also played for the Dallas Cowboys and Detroit Lions. He played college football at South Florida.

High school
Henry Attended Estero High School in Estero, Florida. He was named the District MVP in track, after setting school
records in the triple jump (44”1’) and high jump (6”6’). In football, he was named Lee County Athlete
of the Year and District Player of the Year. He also lettered in basketball.

College career
Henry accepted a scholarship from the University of South Florida. He didn't play in his first year because of failing to meet the requirements of Proposition 48, but his work in the classroom eventually allowed the NCAA to grant him an additional year of eligibility in 2000.

As freshman he received second-team All-Independent honors at free safety after registering 73 tackles, 2 interceptions and 2 fumble recoveries. The next year, he ranked third on the team with 79 tackles and played quarterback for one series against Valparaiso University. As a junior, he started eight-of-nine games at free safety and registered 62 tackles (fourth on the team), 3 interceptions and 2 fumble recoveries. In his last year he was moved to cornerback, but also saw snaps at
free safety and wide receiver, while finishing with 40 tackles, 5 interceptions (led the team), 8 passes defensed (led the team).

He was in the first batch of 4-year letter winners ever in the USF's football program. He ended his collegiate career with 256 tackles (9 for loss), 6 fumble recoveries, 22 passes defensed and led the team in interceptions two years in a row (1999, 2000).

Henry is a member of the University of South Florida Athletic Hall of Fame and was the Bulls first football player to be inducted into the Hall.

Professional career

Cleveland Browns
Henry was selected by the Cleveland Browns in the fourth round of the 2001 NFL Draft. As a rookie, he played in 16 games (2 starts) and tied for the NFL lead in interceptions with 10. Also set a franchise record with a 97-yard interception return for a touchdown.

He saw less action his second year. In 2003, he was named the starter at right cornerback. In 2004, he tallied 76 tackles, 4 interceptions and 12 passes defensed.

During his four years with the team from 2001 to 2004, he started 39 of 61 games, recording 247 tackles, 17 interceptions,  49 passes defensed and a touchdown.

Dallas Cowboys
Henry signed a five-year, $25 million deal with the Dallas Cowboys as an unrestricted free agent in 2005. With a $10 million signing bonus, a $1 million roster bonus in 2005 and a $1 million roster bonus in 2006. He got paid $18 million over the first three years of his contract. He missed four games with a severe groin injury, that also limited him during the last 8 games of the year.

In 2006, he was limited with a knee injury but still recorded 90 tackles (third on the team), 23 passes defensed (led the team) and 2 interceptions. In 2007, he was limited with a high ankle sprain and still managed to lead the team with six interceptions (tied for fifth in the NFL). In 2008, he played 16 games (15 starts), registering 55 tackles (35 solo), 7 passes defensed, one interception  and 2 sacks.

On February 28, 2009, he was traded to the Detroit Lions in exchange for quarterback Jon Kitna. He played four seasons for the Cowboys from 2005 to 2008, starting 51 of 56 games, recording 215 tackles, 12 interceptions, two sacks, and two touchdowns.

Detroit Lions
Henry was benched in week 5 of the 2009 season because of his play and replaced with Phillip Buchanon. He was not re-signed at the end of the year.

Personal life
Venturing out to Los Angeles to pursue a career in entertainment, Henry co-stars in the film Once Upon a Time in Brooklyn starring William DeMeo & Ice-T. Henry also launched his online music magazine Coool Flame (www.CooolFlame.com) in February 2013, which focused on urban music. He is also an investor with First Picks Management (owned by former NFL Player Keyshawn Johnson), owning several Panera Breads across the Southern California region.

References

1976 births
Living people
Sportspeople from Fort Myers, Florida
South Florida Bulls football players
American football cornerbacks
American football safeties
Cleveland Browns players
Dallas Cowboys players
Detroit Lions players
Players of American football from Florida